Rajya Sabha elections were held on various dates in 1957, to elect members of the Rajya Sabha, Indian Parliament's upper chamber.

Elections
Elections were held to elect members from various states.

Members elected
The following members are elected in the elections held in 1957. They are members for the term 1957-1963 and retire in year 1963, except in case of the resignation or death before the term.
The list is incomplete.

State - Member - Party

Bye-elections
The following bye elections were held in the year 1957.

State - Member - Party

 Delhi  - Maganlal B Joshi - INC  ( ele   31/01/1957 term till 1962 ) res 01/03/1962 LS
 Delhi - S K Dey - INC ( ele 31/01/1957 res 01/03/1962 3LS)
 Andhra - M H Samuel - INC (  ele  18/04/1957 term till 1958 )
 Orissa - Bhubananda Das - INC ( ele  20/04/1957 dea. 23/02/1958 )
 Punjab  - Rajkumari Amrit Kaur - INC  ( ele 20/04/1957 term till 1958 )
 Punjab  - Jugal Kishore - INC  ( ele 20/04/1957 term till 1962 )
 Rajasthan - Jai Narayan Vyas  - INC ( ele 20/04/1957 term till 1960 )
 Madras - T.S. Pattabiraman  - INC ( ele 20/04/1957 term till 1960 )
 Madras - N Ramakrishna Iyer   - INC ( ele 20/04/1957 term till 1960 )
 Bombay - Maganlal B Joshi - INC ( ele  22/04/1957 term till 1958)
 Bombay - Sonusinh D Patil - INC ( ele  22/04/1957 term till 1958 )
 Bombay - Jethalal H Joshi - INC ( ele  22/04/1957 term till 1960 )
 Bombay - P. N. Rajabhoj - INC ( ele  22/04/1957 term till 1962)
 Uttar Pradesh  - Purushottam Das Tandon - INC  ( ele   22/04/1957 term till 1962 ) res 01/01/1960 
 Uttar Pradesh - Hira Vallabha Tripathi - INC ( ele  22/04/1957 term till 1960 )
 Madras - S Ammu - INC ( ele   22/04/1957 term till 1960 )
 Kerala - Dr Parekunnel J Thomas- IND ( ele   22/04/1957 term till 1962 )
 Mysore  - B C Nanjundaiya - INC ( ele   25/04/1957 term till 1960 )
 Mysore  - B Shiva Rao - INC ( ele   25/04/1957 term till 1960 )
 Bihar - Sheel Bhadra Yajee - INC (  ele  27/04/1957 term till 1958 )
 Madras - A V Kuhambu - CPI ( ele   27/04/1957 term till 1960 )
 Orissa  - Bhubananda Das - INC  ( ele 27/04/1957 term till 1958 ) dea 23/02/1958
 Orissa  -Lingraj Mishra - INC  ( ele 27/04/1957 term till 1962 ) dea 19/12/1957
 Assam  - Suresh Chandra Deb  - INC ( ele  03/05/1957 term till 1960 )
 West Bengal - Santosh Kumar Basu - INC ( ele  03/05/1957 term till 1958 )
 West Bengal - Sitaram Daga- INC ( ele  03/05/1957 term till 1958 )
 West Bengal - Dr Nihar Ranjan Ray - INC ( ele  03/05/1957 term till 1962 )
 Nominated - Dr Tara Chand - NOM ( ele  22/08/1957 term till 1962 )
 Madras - Swaminathan Ammu  - INC ( ele  09/11/1957 term till 1960 )
 Bombay  - Jadavji K Modi - INC  ( ele   21/11/1957 term till 1962)

References

1957 elections in India
1957